Galvis is a surname. Notable people with the surname include:

Alejandro Galvis Galvis (1891–1981), Colombian publisher and politician
Claudia Galvis (born 1990), Bolivian footballer
Freddy Galvis (born 1989), Venezuelan baseball player
Nicolás Galvis (born 1997), Colombian footballer